King Khalid Military City (KKMC) (transliterated: Medinat Al-Malek Khaled Al-Askariyah) is a special city in northeastern Saudi Arabia and about 60 km south of Hafar al-Batin city, designed and built by the Middle East Division, a unit of the United States Army Corps of Engineers, in the 1970s and 1980s. The consultants were Brown, Daltas, and Associates as well as LeMessurier in Cambridge, Massachusetts. The city was built to provide lodging for several brigades of Saudi troops, with a design population of 65,000 people.

The city is named after former Saudi King Khalid bin Abdul Aziz.

Construction
The Corps of Engineers King Khalid Military City (KKMC) was as extensive as any of the Kingdom's massive private programs. Saudi Arabia sought and received U.S. Corps assistance in part because it was impressed with the Dhahran civil air terminal and other early projects the Corps built with US funds. The Kingdom also lacked the expertise to manage a huge program at that time. However, equally important was the U.S. corps reputation as an effective and honest public servant. The Saudis preferred entrusting their defence construction to a government agency. Saudi Minister of Defense and Aviation, Prince Sultan, starting in 1964 anticipated the three cantonments; King Faisal Military Cantonment at Khamis Mushayt in the southwest near Yemen; King Abdul Aziz Military Cantonment (later "City") at Tabuk Province in the northwest near Jordan; and in the spring of 1973, the Ministry approved changing the site of the third cantonment from Qaysumah to Hafar al-Batin in the north near Iraq.<ref ="grathwol" 

The Engineer Assistance Agreement, effective May 24, 1965, and extended several times, provides the basic framework for much of the Corps activities in Saudi Arabia. The Agreement was entered into pursuant to section 507(a) of the Foreign Assistance Act of 1961, and is currently authorized by section 22 of the Arms Export Act with the Ministry of Defense and Aviation (MODA) further committed the (Mediterranean Division, later the Middle East Division) US Army Corps of Engineers, initially to design and construct three brigade-size military cantonments to house elements of the Saudi Arabian Army. In the spring of 1973, MODA approved changing the location of the third cantonment from Qaysumah to Hafar al Batin and expand the cantonment to a "Military City". In March 1974 a $1.5 million contract to a joint venture with Sippican Architectural Engineering and Brown Daltas & Associates Rome, Italy office. Over the next 13 months, the joint venture surveyed to location and without estimates to the City's population the venture identified the architectural theme, required utilities, buildings and facilities to MODA in May 1975 with a one brigade troop strength. Prince Sultan, head of MODA, approved the outline and concept and added two more brigade troop strength of 5000 men each. The growing demand for construction created a need to import vast quantities
of construction materials and labor.

The region had only limited capabilities for dealing with the inflow of goods and workers. When construction began at Khamis Mushayt in 1966, strained Saudi port facilities had barely coped. Nothing had improved by the mid-1970s. U.S. Corps personnel became increasingly concerned about the limited ability of Saudi Arabia’s ports to handle the volume of shipping needed to sustain the large construction projects under design. As serious discussions began concerning construction of the cantonment at Hafar al-Batin, the military academy, and the medical research and treatment center at Al Kharj, the division’s engineers again voiced their concern about port capacity. In late 1974, the division commissioned a study of the port conditions and the transportation facilities needed to support the planned programs. In mid-November 1975, U.S. Corps personnel presented to Prince
Sultan the idea of constructing a port on the Saudi east coast at Ra's al Mish'ab near the border with Kuwait. The port would handle only materials imported for the al Batin.In June 1975 tentative approval of a $9 million contract for further design a procurement packages for the City. In the first week of January 1976, MODA named the new city King Khalid Military City in honor of Saudi King Khalid.

Planning for the city began in 1974 and, after a new Persian Gulf port was built in Ra's al-Mish'ab to handle all the material being brought in, construction began. Built in collaboration with local national engineers and project managers, various phases of the project were completed throughout the 1980s. The scope of the project was very large with 21 new wells being drilled to provide water, a new port for supplies, 3,387 double story family housing units with utility tunnels, and five, multi-domed mosques and associated facilities.  Also, the world's largest pre-cast concrete plant, built on-site, was used and built by the Samwhan Corporation.  The city was finally completed in 1987.

Gulf War
During the Gulf War, KKMC was used to house thousands of American and other coalition soldiers. Its airport was one of the most used during combat operations, along with bases in Dhahran and Riyadh, Saudi Arabia.

During the war, KKMC was protected from ballistic missiles by the U.S's Patriot missile system. On February 21, 1991 Iraq fired three Scud missiles at King Khalid Military City, which were reportedly destroyed by Patriot interceptors.

Present use
At its peak, hundreds of US Army Corps engineers and personnel made KKMC their home, and a small American city evolved within the Saudi military city. Today, US presence at KKMC is minimal with only a small number of US government personnel still working and living there as in a few foreigners from different countries also come here to work. There are many expatriates living in the city, some of them born there.

See also
 List of things named after Saudi Kings
 Military of Saudi Arabia
 Royal Saudi Air Force
 List of military installations in Saudi Arabia
 King Khalid Military College

References

External links and sources

External links

Short history on KKMC
Report on the Middle East Division

Sources
Samwhan Corp. site
Department of Defense report on Iraq's use of scud missiles

1976 establishments in Saudi Arabia
Military installations of Saudi Arabia
Saudi Arabia–United States relations